Heroes Chronicles is a series of turn-based strategy video games developed by Jon Van Caneghem through New World Computing and published by the 3DO Company. The series was intended to introduce a new audience, such as casual gamers, to the Heroes of Might and Magic series. As part of that strategy, each installment of Chronicles was released as a low-cost episode containing a relatively short single-player campaign, and the difficulty level of each game was kept low. All Chronicles games are based on a limited version of the Heroes of Might and Magic III game engine, although the ability to play scenario maps and multiplayer games is not included in any Chronicles title.

The series consists of eight installments released in five retail packages and supplemented by two downloadable packages. The first two titles, Warlords of the Wasteland and Conquest of the Underworld, were released on September 27, 2000. The next two installments, Masters of the Elements and Clash of the Dragons, were released shortly thereafter on November 14, 2000. In the meantime, 3DO offered The World Tree as a free download, which would install on any system with at least two retail episodes. Similarly, Fiery Moon would install on any system with at least three retail episodes. Lastly, The Sword of Frost and Revolt of the Beastmasters were released together under the name The Final Chapters on June 1, 2001. All eight games were released through GOG.com in June 2011.

Gameplay
Gameplay in Heroes Chronicles is similar to the campaigns included in Heroes of Might and Magic III and its expansions. A campaign consists of a series of scenarios linked with a storyline told through narrated CGI cutscenes and in-game text. Each scenario involves a mix of strategic exploration on a world map and tactical turn-based combat as the player fights enemies, conquers towns, collects items, and completes objectives. All of the installments featured eight scenarios except for the two downloadable installments, which only included five scenarios each.

The player controls a number of "heroes" who act as generals who command troops who are various types of creatures inspired by myth and legend. These heroes can also gain experience, learn skills, cast spells, and collect items that benefit their army on the world map or in tactical battles. A hero character integral to the installments' storyline would need to survive each scenario and could sometimes bring experience, spells, or other surviving heroes into subsequent scenarios with them. At the beginning of each scenario, the player could adjust the difficulty level and choose a starting bonus that usually included extra units, resources, skills, or a unique item.

Plot
The storylines of the eight installments follow the rise and fall of the tragic hero Tarnum. His initial rise to power is chronicled in the "Warlords of the Wasteland" installment, set prior to the events of Heroes of Might and Magic III, with all of the other installments occurring after the events of Heroes of Might and Magic III. Half of the installments featured self-contained storylines, while the two downloadable titles "The World Tree" and "The Fiery Moon" shared a storyline and the last installment, "The Sword of Frost," served as a direct sequel to the fourth installment "Clash of the Dragons." Tarnum would reappear in Heroes of Might and Magic IV.

References

External links

2000 video games
Episodic video games
Heroes of Might and Magic
Video games developed in the United States
Video games scored by Paul Romero
Video games scored by Steve Baca
Windows games
Windows-only games
Single-player video games